The 2011 Redditch Borough Council election to the Redditch Borough Council was held on 5 May 2011. All Council wards, apart from Central and Lodge Parks were voting in the local elections; in the Greenlands ward two councillors were up for election.

Election results

Ward Results

Abbey Ward

Astwood Bank and Feckenham Ward

Batchley and Brockhill Ward

Church Hill Ward

Crabbs Cross and Rural Ward

Greenlands Ward

Headless Cross and Oakenshaw Ward

Matchborough Ward

West Ward

Winyates Ward

2011 English local elections
2011
2010s in Worcestershire